Joseph Merchant (October 3, 1844 – June 22, 1914) was an American politician in the state of Washington. He served in the Washington House of Representatives from 1893 to 1897.

References

Republican Party members of the Washington House of Representatives
1844 births
1914 deaths
French emigrants to the United States
19th-century American politicians